Abortion in Liechtenstein is illegal in most circumstances with limited exceptions in cases where the life of the pregnant woman is at risk, or where the pregnancy has resulted from a sexual offence.  Religion in Liechtenstein is mainly Roman Catholic, which is reflected in the faith of the ruling Princely House of Leichtenstein and in the country's laws and culture around pregnancy.

Law on abortion
The Criminal Code (Strafgesetzbuch) of Liechtenstein (in section 96) states that:

The above acts shall not be punishable if the termination of pregnancy is:

 necessary to avert serious danger to the life or serious damage to the health of the pregnant woman that cannot be averted otherwise (and additionally the pregnancy is terminated by a physician);

 the pregnancy is the result of a sexual offence or the pregnant woman was under-age at the time of conception (and additionally the pregnancy is terminated by a physician); or

 undertaken to save the pregnant woman from an immediate danger to life that cannot be averted otherwise, under circumstances not permitting medical assistance to be obtained in time.

Sections 97 and 98 of the Strafgesetzbuch, respectively, prohibit termination of pregnancy without the consent of the pregnant woman and grossly negligent intervention in respect of a pregnant woman, including the promotion of abortion.  Leichtenstein has a high quality health service.

Proposals
In a double referendum on abortion in November 2005, 81% of voters rejected a For Life proposal to prohibit all abortion – "The supreme task of the state is the protection of human life from conception to natural death and to promote the overall welfare of the People" – while 80% approved the counter-proposal from the Landtag (Parliament) to be included in the Constitution of Liechtenstein:
 The dignity of man is to be respected and protected.
 No one shall be subjected to inhuman or degrading treatment or punishment.
 Everyone has the right to life.
 The death penalty is prohibited.

A proposal to legalize abortion, in the first 12 weeks of pregnancy or when the unborn child was disabled, was defeated by 52.3% of voters in a further referendum held in September 2011. Prince Alois had previously threatened to veto the proposal if it passed.

In April and November 2012, the Landtag considered but did not advance proposals to relax abortion laws.

Until an amendment of the Criminal Code in 2015, the exception for rape was limited to cases where the victim of the rape was aged under 14 years old.

Statistics
Women in Liechtenstein who choose to have an abortion must cross the border, to either neighboring Switzerland or Austria, to have the procedure carried out legally or to obtain advice in relation to abortion. In 2011, it was estimated that approximately 50 women a year had abortions, either illegally in Liechtenstein or abroad in either Switzerland or Austria. There are around 300 to 400 live births each year in the principality, which had a population of around 39,000 people in 2021.

See also
Healthcare in Liechtenstein

References